The 2017 MBC Entertainment Awards presented by Munhwa Broadcasting Corporation (MBC), took place on December 29, 2017 at MBC Public Hall in Sangam-dong, Mapo-gu, Seoul. It was hosted by Kim Hee-chul, Han Hye-jin and Yang Se-hyung. The nominees were chosen from MBC variety, music shows and sitcom that aired from December 2016 to November 2017.

Nominations and winners

Presenters

Special performances

References

External links 

MBC TV original programming
MBC Entertainment Awards
2017 television awards
2017 in South Korea